Russian Orthodoxy is the body of several churches within the larger communion of Eastern Orthodox Christianity, whose liturgy is or was traditionally conducted in Church Slavonic language. Most Churches of the Russian Orthodox tradition are part of the Eastern Orthodox Church.

Origin 
Historically, the term "Greek Orthodox" has been used to describe all Eastern Orthodox churches, since the term "Greek" can refer to the heritage of the Byzantine Empire. However, after the fall of Constantinople, the Greek influence decreased. Having lost its Christian basileus after the Turkish conquest, Constantinople, as a center of power, lost a significant part of its authority. On the other hand, the Moscow rulers soon began to consider themselves real Tsars (this title was already used by Ivan III), and therefore, according to them, the center of the Eastern Orthodox Church should be located in Moscow, and thus the bishop of Moscow should become the head of Orthodoxy. With some Eastern Orthodox people calling Moscow the "Third Rome", or the "New Rome", the Russian Church gained influence in the orthodox world outside the Ottoman Empire. After this event, a series of doctrinal and liturgical differences would emerge in the Slavic Orthodox world, being cut off from its Greek counterpart. By the mid 17th century the religious practices of the Russian Orthodox Church were distinct from those of the Greek Orthodox Church. Eventually, Patriarch Nikon of Moscow would reform the church and bring most of its practices back into accommodation with the contemporary forms of Greek Orthodox worship. This change, however, was rejected by a large group of traditionalists, who would come to be known as Old Ritualists.

Church bodies

Part of the Eastern Orthodox Communion 
 Autocephalous churches:
 Czech and Slovak Orthodox Church
 Orthodox Church in America (except Romanian, Bulgarian and Albanian ethnical dioceses)
 Orthodox Church of Ukraine (autocephaly not recognised by the Russian Orthodox Church)
 Polish Orthodox Church
 Russian Orthodox Church
 Churches belonging to the Russian Orthodox Church:
 Autonomous Churches (recognized):
 Belarusian Orthodox Church
 Latvian Orthodox Church
 Russian Orthodox Church Outside Russia
 Autonomous Churches (semi-recognized):
 Estonian Orthodox Church of Moscow Patriarchate
 Moldovan Orthodox Church
 Orthodox Church of China
 Orthodox Church of Japan
 Exarchates:
 Archdiocese of Russian Orthodox churches in Western Europe
 Patriarchal Exarchate in Western Europe
 Patriarchal Exarchate in South-East Asia
 Russian Orthodox Church in Finland
 Russian Orthodox Patriarchal Parishes in the USA
 Churches under the jurisdiction of the Patriarchate of Constantinople (itself not part of Russian Orthodoxy):
 Autonomous Churches (recognized):
 Orthodox Church of Finland
 Autonomous Churches (semi-recognized):
 Estonian Apostolic Orthodox Church
 Exarchates:
 American Carpatho-Russian Orthodox Diocese
 Ukrainian Orthodox Church of Canada
 Ukrainian Orthodox Church of the USA
 Churches with undefined status:
 Ukrainian Orthodox Church

Outside the Eastern Orthodox Communion 
 Non-canonical church bodies, schism from the Russian Orthodox Church and its autonomous churches:
 American Orthodox Catholic Church (defunct)
 Belarusian Autocephalous Orthodox Church
 Old Believers
 Bezpopovtsy
 Pomorian Old-Orthodox Church
 Popovtsy
 Belokrinitskaya Hierarchy
 Russian Orthodox Old-Rite Church
 Lipovan Orthodox Old-Rite Church
 Russian Old-Orthodox Church
 Edinoverie
 Russian True Orthodox Church
 Russian Orthodox Autonomous Church
 Ukrainian Orthodox Church – Kyiv Patriarchate

See also
 Eastern Orthodoxy
 Greek Orthodoxy
 History of the Eastern Orthodox Church

Literature 
 Русское православие: вехи истории / Науч. ред. А. И. Клибанов. — М.: Политиздат, 1989. — 719 с. — 200 000 экз. — .
 Гордиенко Н. С. Содержание и объём понятия «русское православие» // Вестник Ленинградского государственного университета им. А. С. Пушкина. — 2009. — № 2. — С. 166—175.
 Лексин В. Н. Русское православие сегодня // Контуры глобальных трансформаций: политика, экономика, право. — 2018. — № 4. — doi:10.23932/2542-0240-2018-11-4-65-82.

References

Russian Orthodoxy